The Class S 3/5 engines of the Royal Bavarian State Railways (Königlich Bayerische Staatsbahn) were express train steam locomotives with a 4–6–0 wheel arrangement.

Saturated steam variant
Between 1903 and 1907 Maffei delivered three batches of 39 locomotives in all. They had a four-cylinder, saturated steam compound engine. Unlike their forerunners, the Bavarian Class C V, the inside high-pressure cylinders and the outside low-pressure cylinders were angled and worked on the first coupled axle.

The tube lengths and diameter of the inside cylinders were also changed.

The S 3/5 engines built from 1904 were technically closely related to the S 2/5 which was being developed in parallel. The two classes only differed in their wheel arrangement and the larger coupled wheel diameter on the S 2/5; the boiler and running gear were the same and thus also their output power. Even the permitted top speed was identical on both classes . The S 3/5 N engines were, in terms of tractive effort ( at ), clearly superior to the S 2/5, because they had three driven axles. S 3/5 locomotives were stabled in the locomotive workshops at Munich I and Nuremberg.

The locomotives were coupled with Bavarian 2'2' T 21 and 2'2' T 21,8 tenders.

Superheated steam variant

For the 1906 Bavarian State Exhibition in Nuremberg, Maffei fitted locomotive no. 3329 experimentally with a Schmidt superheater. In addition the bore of the cylinders was increased to /. These measures produced a significant improvement in locomotive performance ( on the level at ), so that from 1908 the Bavarian state railways only ordered the superheated S 3/5 H.

Although the more powerful S 3/6 express locomotive had been available since 1908, the number of S 3/5 H engines had climbed to 30 by 1911, partly because there was insufficient funding for the expensive S 3/6. As a result, the overall number of S 3/5 engines was 69.

Reichsbahn
After World War I, 19 saturated steam and 6 superheated steam locomotives had to be transferred abroad. Seventeen of those went to the French Eastern Railway, five to the AL and two to the Belgian state railway.

The Deutsche Reichsbahn took over the remaining 20 saturate steam engines as Class 17.4 (17 401–420) and had them converted to superheated locomotives in 1925. The remaining 24 superheated engines became Class 17.5 (17 501–524). In the meantime the S 3/5 was mainly used on passenger train duties in the Reichsbahndirektionen of Augsburg and Nuremberg, because enough modern express engines were now available.

The Reichsbahn began to retire the locomotives as early as 1932. Initially the older, former saturated steam engines disappeared, only eight examples remaining after the Second World War; whilst at the same time 21 of the former S 3/5 H locomotives were still working. All the engines were in Bavaria by the end of the war, but were heavily worn out and no longer ran in regular service. Both variants were finally retired by 1948.

See also
 Royal Bavarian State Railways
 List of Bavarian locomotives and railbuses

Sources
 
 
 

4-6-0 locomotives
S 3 5
Standard gauge locomotives of Germany
Railway locomotives introduced in 1903
2′C n4v locomotives
2′C h4v locomotives
Passenger locomotives